In algebra the Dixmier conjecture,  asked by Jacques Dixmier in 1968, is the conjecture that any endomorphism of a Weyl algebra is an automorphism.

Tsuchimoto in 2005, and independently Belov-Kanel and Kontsevich in 2007, showed that the Dixmier conjecture is stably equivalent to the Jacobian conjecture.

References

Abstract algebra
Conjectures
Unsolved problems in mathematics